Natural Illusions is an album by American jazz vibraphonist Bobby Hutcherson recorded in 1972 and released on the Blue Note label.

Reception
The Allmusic review by Stephen Thomas Erlewine awarded the album 1½ stars and stated "Natural Illusions is one of the rare Bobby Hutcherson dates that finds the vibraphonist flirting with the mainstream and fusion... There's little of the unpredictable phrasing and modal harmonies that distinguished Hutcherson's albums, and the music often sounds conventional, making it one of the lesser efforts in his catalog".

Track listing
All compositions by Bobby Hutcherson except where noted
 "When You Are Near" - 3:56
 "The Thrill Is Gone" (Rick Darnell, Roy Hawkins) - 4:23
 "Sophisticated Lady" (Duke Ellington, Irving Mills, Mitchell Parish) - 6:02
 "Rain Every Thursday" - 3:39
 "The Folks Who Live On the Hill" (Oscar Hammerstein II, Jerome Kern) - 4:58
 "Lush Life" (Billy Strayhorn) - 5:28
 "Shirl" (Horace Silver) - 5:10

Personnel
Bobby Hutcherson - vibes
Hank Jones - piano
Gene Bertoncini - guitar
Ron Carter - bass
Jack DeJohnette - drums
Wade Marcus - arranger
Phil Bodner, Hubert Laws, Romeo Penque, Daniel Trimboli - flute
George Marge - oboe
John Leone - bassoon
Eugene Bianco - harp
George Duvivier - bass
Irving Spice, Aaron Rosand - violin
Julian Barber, Seymour Berman - viola
Seymour Barab - cello

References 

Blue Note Records albums
Bobby Hutcherson albums
1972 albums
Albums recorded at Van Gelder Studio